Minago River is a river in the Hudson Bay drainage basin in Northern Manitoba, Canada. It flows in a northeasterly direction from Moon Lake into the western end of Cross Lake on the Nelson River.

From Moon Lake a portage led to South Moose Lake and the Saskatchewan River.

Tributaries
Black Duck Creek (right)
Hargrave River (left)

See also
List of rivers of Manitoba

References

Rivers of Northern Manitoba
Tributaries of Hudson Bay